Santiago Rivera Molina (born 6 February 1992 in Guaymas) is a Mexican professional footballer who last played for Alacranes de Durango.

External links
 
 

Living people
1992 births
Association football forwards
C.F. Monterrey players
Cafetaleros de Chiapas footballers
Alacranes de Durango footballers
Liga MX players
Ascenso MX players
Liga Premier de México players
Tercera División de México players
Footballers from Sonora
People from Guaymas
Mexican footballers